Kabyk is a village in the Osh Region, Kyrgyzstan, in the Vakhsh valley near the border with Tadjikistan. It is part of the Chong-Alay District. Its population was 1,104 in 2021.

References

Populated places in Osh Region